Charles Woods (18 April 1810 – 6 March 1885) was an English cricketer who was associated with Surrey and made his first-class debut in 1828.

References

1810 births
1885 deaths
English cricketers
English cricketers of 1826 to 1863
Surrey cricketers